Vang is a former municipality in the old Hedmark county, Norway. The  municipality existed from 1838 until its dissolution in 1992 when it became part of Hamar Municipality. The administrative centre of the municipality was at Fredvang. This site, however became part of the town of Hamar in 1946, so after that time, the municipal administration was actually located outside the municipal borders in the neighboring municipality. The main church for the municipality was Vang Church in the village of Ridabu.

Gåsbu Ski Center lies in Vang Almenning, and has served as the backup venue for the  Holmenkollrennene. This arena has been described as the cradle of all Nordic ski competition, with more than 112 years of international ski competition. The national cross-country skiing championship was last held here in 2002.

General information
The historic prestegjeld of Vang was established as a municipality on 1 January 1838 (see formannskapsdistrikt law). This newly designated "town" (population: 1,025) was separated from Vang to become a separate municipality in 1849. This left Vang with 7,820 residents. In 1891, the western district of Vang (population: 3,790) was separated from Vang to become the new municipality of Furnes. This left Vang with 5,703 residents. In 1946, a large area in Vang that surrounded the town of Hamar (population: 4,087) was transferred out of Vang and into Hamar. On 13 July 1956, the parts of Vang located south of the Åkersvika bay (population: 24) were transferred to Stange Municipality.

On 1 January 1964, the Hamarsberget and Vikersødegården exclave areas of Vang (population: 34) were transferred to the neighboring Ringsaker Municipality. On 1 January 1967 there was a municipal land swap between Vang and Ringsaker. The  Stav, Valsigsvea, and Arnkvern Nedre areas of Vang (population: 50) was transferred to Ringsaker Municipality and the  Stensby and Holmlund areas of Ringsaker (population: 114) was transferred to Vang. On 1 January 1992, the municipality of Vang (population: 9,103) was merged with the town of Hamar (population: 16,351) and parts of the Stensby, Hanstad, Viker, and Stammerud areas of Ringsaker (population: 224) to form the new Hamar Municipality.

Name
The municipality (originally the parish) was named after the old Vang farm since the first Vang Church was built there. The word vangr means "field" or "meadow". Since the municipal consolidation in 1992, the name Øvre Vang is used locally as the common name for the area outside the town of Hamar that was once part of the old municipality of Vang.

Churches
The Church of Norway had one parish within the municipality of Vang. It is part of the Hamar domprosti (arch-deanery) in the Diocese of Hamar.

History

Early history
Archeological evidence provides ties between the Vendel era culture in Uppland and Vang in the period from 600 to 800 AD. Most notable is finding of a fine examples of a Vendel Culture style ring sword in Vang burial mounds; each sword's hilt is adorned with a heavy gold ring upon which oaths were sworn. The use of the ring sword is also mentioned in Beowulf and the Eddas.

Åker gård (Aaker farm) in Vang was the site of an ancient Thing place; it was there that King Magnus I agreed to share power with his uncle Harald Hardråde and the two became co-rulers. In the 11th century the Thing was moved to Eidsvol.

Åker remained a king's farm during the Viking period, as well as a local headquarters for the military. At the end of the Hannibal War, General Georg von Reichwein was granted Åker gård as his residence. During the following years it continued to be the residence of senior military officers. Jørgen Otto Brockenhuus, founder of the Brockenhuss –Schack family, resided there in the early 18th century.

19th-20th centuries
Vang municipality was established in 1837, when the municipality law came into effect. The municipality borders were those which had been established by a border commission in 1730. It was named after Vang church; since the early Iron Age the region had been known as Ridabu.

In 1847, the executive council majority agreed that Hamar should be restored to kjøpstad status, but the decision was controversial and some believed the basis for the decision was illogical. Vang gave up additional land to Hamar in 1878, 1946, 1947 and 1965. In 1891 the district of Furnes was separated from Vang to create a municipality of its own.

The earliest village was Hjellum - a contraction of «Hjellum-by`n». It was there that the train station for the Rørosbanen line between Elverum and Hamar stopped. In the same place Sanderud asylum (now hospital) was located.

During the Second World War, especially after 1944, many resistance fighters hid in Vangsåsa. About 70 persons found refuge in the Norwegian resistance Milorg's district 77 rural huts. On 26 October, German troops assaulted one of the huts and two resistance fighters were killed. A third escaped miraculously.

After 1947 the Østland District Commandos had their headquarters at Åker gård.

After the Second World War more villages developed: Ridabu, Ingeberg, Vangli, and Wik.

Merger with Hamar
The government had been debating merging Vang and Hamar (and sometimes Løten) for several decades. There was strong local opposition in Vang — a referendum held 22 and 23 April 1990 showed 95% of the Vang residents opposed incorporation into Hamar, with a 64.7% turnout rate. Support in Hamar was stronger as Vang was a prosperous farming municipality, while Hamar suffered from urban decay. The Storting forced the merger which took place on 1 January 1992. The sponsor for the consolidation was Odd Aspeli (of the Arbeiderpartiet). He took over as Mayor in Hamar after consolidation and remained as Mayor until 1999. Another chief sponsor against consolidation, Einar Busterud, then assumed the position of Mayor.

Government
The municipal council  of Vang was made up of 29 representatives that were elected to four year terms.  The party breakdown of the final municipal council was as follows:

Mayors
The mayors of Vang (incomplete list):
1929-1931: Arne Juland (Ap)
1931-1965: Rudolf Hedemann (Ap)
1943-1945: Aksel Røhr (NS)
1965-1969: Arve Nysted (Ap)
1969-1984: Kåre Storsveen (Ap)
1984-1987: Ole Andreas Brodal (Ap)
1988-1991: Odd Aspeli (Ap)

Notable people
 Werner Hosewinckel Christie
 Werner Christie
 Mikkel Dobloug
 Olga Imerslund
 Abraham Pihl
 Matthias Stoltenberg
 Ralph Engelstad (1930-2002), an American whose grandfather Peter emigrated from Vang to Minnesota

See also
List of former municipalities of Norway

References

Hamar
Former municipalities of Norway
1838 establishments in Norway
1992 disestablishments in Norway
Populated places established in 1838
Populated places disestablished in 1992